Cepedea is a genus of heterokonts.

Examples are Cepedea virguloidea and Cepedea longa.
A detailed list of all reported Cepedea species was compiled by Li et al (2017).

Gallery

References

Placidozoa
Heterokont genera